Foxboro is an unincorporated community, in Douglas County, in the town of Summit, in the northwestern part of the U.S. state of Wisconsin.

County Road B serves as a main route in the community.  Wisconsin Highway 35 is nearby.

Foxboro is located southwest of the city of Superior; and located west of Pattison State Park and Big Manitou Falls. Foxboro has a zip code, 54836 but no post office. The nearest post offices are Superior and South Range.

References

Unincorporated communities in Douglas County, Wisconsin
Unincorporated communities in Wisconsin